Microchlora is a genus of snout moths. It was described by George Hampson in 1901.

Species
 Microchlora bilineella Hampson, 1917
 Microchlora eariasella Hampson in Ragonot, 1901

References

Tirathabini
Pyralidae genera
Taxa named by George Hampson